A Bell Is a Cup... Until It Is Struck is the fifth studio  album by the British post-punk group Wire.

Critical response
In 1989, the Trouser Press Record Guide described the album as "a stylized set of dreamscapes and consciousness streams… It's arguably Wire's most ruminative album, and while immersion in it won't, as 'Silk Skin Paws' suggests, 'wring your senses' – that's more a job for Chairs Missing – it will twirl your lobes a time or two." However, in a later edition, Trouser Press held a more critical view, writing "Wire stayed the dance-pop course with diminishing results on A Bell Is a Cup."

At the time of the album's release, Wire faced accusations that they had abandoned their earlier rough-edged sound for a softer, more refined style.  Graham Lewis dismissed such criticism:

Allmusic gave the album a laudatory review, describing the record as "arguably Wire's best album and certainly its most accessible… a work of modern rock genius."

Cover art
The sculpture shown is the Selene horse from the Parthenon Marbles.

Track listing
All tracks published by Stainless Music.

The CD version appends the following tracks:

Personnel
Wire
Bruce Gilbert
Robert Gotobed
Graham Lewis (credited as "Lewis")
Colin Newman
Production
 Gareth Jones  – production
 David Heilmann – engineer
 Paul Davis – front of house engineer [13, 14] 
 Simon Hardiman – stage monitor engineer [13, 14] 
 Ifan Thomas – backline [13, 14] 
 Slim Smith – layout

References

1988 albums
Albums produced by Gareth Jones (music producer)
Mute Records albums
Wire (band) albums